Interact Incorporated is a technology company that specializes in providing interactive voice response (IVR) applications and real-time billing and rating platforms.

Interact is headquartered in Lincoln, Nebraska, with a research and development facility in Austin, Texas, as well as a regional sales office in Phoenix, Arizona.

Products and services 
 Invigorate: 3GPP real-time billing and rating platform that supports Diameter
 VIP (Voice Information Processing): interactive voice response system (IVR)
 SPOT SIP Engine: VoiceXML and CCXML interpreters with integrated SIP stack
 Listen: conferencing, voicemail, find-me / follow-me, and IP-PBX system
 Realize: system monitoring
 Hosting

History 
In 2009, Interact won a Technology Marketing Corporation Internet Telephony magazine Product of the Year Award for the SPOT SIP Engine.

In June 2010, Interact announced the Summer 2010 release of the InvigoratePlus, a real-time billing and rating platform. Interact has been acknowledged as a contributor to the CCXML 1.0 Implementation Report, first published on July 15, 2010.

References

External links
Interact website
SPOT test portal

Telecommunications companies of the United States
Companies based in Nebraska
Technology companies established in 1981